Sir (Amba) Etim Jack Okpoyo  (born 23 September 1943) was a Nigerian politician in the late 20th Century. From an Oron origin, he was a former and First Deputy Governor of Akwa Ibom State from 1992-1993. He was a businessman, a one-time Ambassador of Nigeria to Italy and Albania and a Civil Engineer. He was a Rotarian who believed strongly in community service and served the Oro nation in various leadership capacities.

Early life
Born on 23 September 1943, Sir (Amb.) Etim Jack Okpoyo, the seventh child of his late parents, Chief Jack and Mrs. Akon Okpoyo, of blessed memory, started Eyubia Central School.

In 1950 he was transferred to District Council School Oruko, where he obtained his First School Leaving Certificate [FSLC]. He was a good student and popularly known for playing music in the community. In 1959 he proceeded to Lutheran High School. Obot Idim, now in Ibesikpo Asutan Local Government Area, to obtain his West African School Certificate [WASC] in Division Two in 1963, all in Akwa Ibom state.

In 1964 he received a diploma in Civil Engineering from the Yaba College of Technology,  and in 1973 he got his first degree in Civil Engineering from Fourah Bay College, University of Sierra Leone. For two years, he also served as a President of the Oron Development Union Port Harcourt branch. For five consecutive years, he also served as a President General of the Oruko Development Association and as a Board of Trustees member of the Oron Local Government Industrial and Development Fund. He is a Rotarian who believes strongly in community service.

Before public services, Sir Okpoyo worked as a survey party chief with Louis Berger Engineering Company. Between 1974 -1991 he also worked with Nigerian Agip Oil Company Limited, Port Harcourt, from where he resigned to go into the private business.

Politics & public service
He is the first civilian deputy governor,  having been elected along with the late Obong Akpan Isemin in 1992 under the platform of the National Republican Convention, NRC.  Charismatic and quite cerebral, Sir (Amb.) Etim Jack Okpoyo, Knight of John Wesley (KJW), came into public service after a rewarding career in the oil and gas industry and business. He served as Deputy Governor from 1992 -1993.  Between 2000 – 2003, he served as the Nigerian Ambassador to Italy and Albania.

Sir (Amb.) Etim Jack Okpoyo was honored by the church as a Knight of John Wesley (KJW) and under the then Archdiocese of Calabar for quite a long time. A former Deputy Governor of Akwa Ibom state, a former Nigerian Ambassador to Italy and Albania from 2000 to 2003 who worked with Louis Berger Engineering Company as a survey party Chief. He also worked with Nigerian Agip Oil Company Limited Port Harcourt, where he was elevated to the Head of Civil Works and resigned in 1991 to set up his own company.

References

1949 births
Living people
Oron people
Akwa Ibom State politicians
Nigerian diplomats